"One Love" is a song by English boy band Blue. Co-written by the band and StarGate, who also produced the track, it was released in the United Kingdom on 21 October 2002 as the lead single from their second studio album, One Love (2002). It reached number three on the UK Singles Chart and entered the top 10 in Denmark, Ireland, Italy, and New Zealand. "One Love" has received a silver certification from the British Phonographic Industry (BPI), representing shipments at least 200,000 copies in the UK. The song's music video was directed by Cameron Casey.

Chart performance
The song was a hit in the UK, peaking at number three. The song also made the top 5 in Ireland (number four) and New Zealand (number five). It reached number 36 in Australia, number seven in Denmark, number 24 in Belgium and number nine in Italy.

Track listings

UK and Japanese CD single
 "One Love" – 3:25
 "Get Ready" – 3:23
 "One Love" (Octave remix) – 3:38
 "One Love" (video) – 3:25

UK cassette single and European CD single
 "One Love" – 3:25
 "Get Ready" – 3:23

Australian CD single
 "One Love"
 "Get Ready"
 "One Love" (Octave remix)

Credits and personnel
Credits are taken from the UK CD single liner notes

Studios
 Recorded and mixed at StarGate Studios (Norway)
 Vocals recorded at Metropolis Studios (London, England)
 Additional vocals recorded at Sony Music Studios (London, England)

Personnel

 StarGate – production
 Mikkel SE – writing, all instruments
 Hallgeir Rustan – writing, all instruments
 Tor Erik Hermansen – writing, all instruments
 Neil Tucker – vocal engineering
 Max Dodson – photography
 Blue – all vocals
 Antony Costa – writing
 Duncan James – writing
 Lee Ryan – writing
 Simon Webbe – writing

Charts

Weekly charts

Year-end charts

Certifications and sales

Release history

References

2002 singles
2002 songs
Blue (English band) songs
Innocent Records singles
Song recordings produced by Stargate (record producers)
Songs written by Antony Costa
Songs written by Duncan James
Songs written by Hallgeir Rustan
Songs written by Lee Ryan
Songs written by Mikkel Storleer Eriksen
Songs written by Simon Webbe
Songs written by Tor Erik Hermansen
Virgin Records singles